AKBingo! (stylized in all caps) is a Japanese television variety show featuring Japanese idol girl group AKB48. The show aired weekly  on Nippon Television. In each episode, members of AKB48 and occasionally their sister groups participate in activities that include quizzes, games, sports, and news.

The original show was cancelled in 2019, and has been succeeded by two different shows since then: AKBingo! NEO and AKB48 Sayonara Mōri-san.

History 
AKBingo! is the successor of two previous shows featuring AKB48 with very similar concepts, AKB 0ji 59fun and AKB 1ji 59fun. The concept of the show was reused for the Sakamichi Series groups with NogiBingo! for Nogizaka46, KeyaBingo! for Keyakizaka46 and HinaBingo! for Hinatazaka46, as well as STU48 with SetoBingo! and HKT48 with HKTBingo! in 2018, and SKE48 with SKEBingo! in 2019.

The hosts of the show were changed in June 2016 after 395 episodes, when the owarai comedy duo Bad Boys, consisting of Kiyoto Ōmizo & Masaki Sata, were succeeded by Woman Rush Hour, consisting of Daisuke Muramoto & Paradise Nakagawa.

From episode 414 onwards (November 1, 2016), a new intro and logo came into use.

AKBingo! is one of the shows featured on a 2018 The Ellen DeGeneres Show segment about "outrageous" Japanese game shows.

On , Muramoto announced that the show would end in September after an 11-year run.

2021: AKBingo! NEO 
In January 2021, it was announced that a revival project for the show, later titled AKBingo! NEO, would be launched. The twelve participating members would be picked from the top of the member leaderboards in the mobile card game , in which players can contribute points to support members of their choice, by the end of the month. The top three members (Yuiri Murayama, Nana Okada, and Haruna Hashimoto) had each accumulated more than eight billion points by the end of the contest period (each match in the game, which rules are similar to Uno, yields around 3000 points for the winner and a few hundred points for the other three participants).

The first episode of AKBingo! NEO was released on March 29, 2021 on the BS Nippon satellite television channel, again hosted by Woman Rush Hour. Episode two was released on July 20, in which Muramoto announced that he would leave the show to move to the United States. The final episode was released on December 29, featuring Paradise Nakagawa and the comedy trio Jungle Pocket as hosts.

2022: AKB48 Sayonara Mōri-san 

In March 2022, it was announced that a new AKB48 variety show, titled AKB48 Sayonara Mōri-san, would start airing in April. The show was titled in honor of producer Shinobu Mōri (毛利忍), who had produced the Bingo! series and other idol variety shows for 13 years, and would be staffed by a new production team in order to "update the show for the Reiwa era". It would be hosted by the comedy duo Shimofuri Myojo and former AKB48 member and AKBingo! regular Minami Minegishi.

Cast
Final
 Daisuke Muramoto - 
 Paradise Nakagawa - 
 AKB48
 SKE48
 NMB48 
 HKT48 
 NGT48 
 STU48 

Former

 Kiyoto Ōmizo - 
 Masaki Sata -

International versions

China 
The Chinese version is titled SNHello 星萌学院 and consists of the members of SNH48, the former Chinese sister group of AKB48 who have since become independent to AKB48. The show is telecast online every Friday starting from July 4, 2014, but the network sometimes offers some "sneak peeks", on Thursdays.

Indonesia 
The Indonesian version is titled IClub48 and stars JKT48, AKB48's Indonesian sister group, and host Brandon Nicholas. The show aired twice a weekend on NET, among other Indonesian networks.

Thailand 
The Thai version is titled Victory BNK48 and stars BNK48, the Thai sister group of AKB48. It aired on Workpoint TV. It is the successor to a previous show featuring the group, BNK48 Show, which was broadcast on Channel 3. There is also a documentary series titled BNK48 Senpai.

Philippines 
MNLife and MNLaugh! both appeared on the official YouTube channel of MNL48, AKB48's Filipino sister group. Both shows were hosted by Luke Conde and a special co-host, who was a member of MNL48 and varied from episode to episode. They were later replaced by MNL48 I-SCHOOL, which also appeared on the group's YouTube channel.

References

External links
  

AKB48
Japanese variety television shows
2008 Japanese television series debuts
Nippon TV original programming
2019 Japanese television series endings